Tropical Depression One was a weak tropical cyclone that struck Cuba and the Bahamas in May and June 1993. It formed in the western Caribbean Sea on May 31 and produced heavy rainfall along its path. In Cuba, the precipitation reached , which caused widespread flooding and damage in nine provinces. Over 16,500 houses were damaged, and a further 1,860 were destroyed. At least seven people were killed in the country. In neighboring Haiti, the flooding killed thirteen people, as well as thousands of livestock. Rainfall was also reported in southern Florida, which eased drought conditions. The depression eventually crossed the Bahamas and became extratropical.

Meteorological history

The origins of the tropical depression were from a tropical wave that exited the coast of Africa on May 13. It crossed the Atlantic Ocean and Caribbean Sea, reaching a position east of the Yucatan Peninsula by May 25. The system interacted with a monsoon-type circulation over Central America, and a broad low-level circulation developed near Cozumel, Mexico. Atmospheric pressure in the region fell gradually as the system organized, and on May 31, the National Hurricane Center classified it as Tropical Depression One near the Isle of Youth. At the time of being upgraded, the circulation was located on the northwest side of the convection due to wind shear. Throughout its duration, the depression maintained a northeast track, due to an approaching shortwave trough to its north. Late on May 31, the poorly organized center crossed western Cuba, accompanied by heavy rainfall but light winds. By the time the circulation reached the Florida Straits, it was exposed and removed from the convection, although slight intensification was anticipated. The depression accelerated northeastward through the Bahamas, passing near Nassau. By June 2, reconnaissance flights into the system had difficulty discerning a circulation. Later that day, the National Hurricane Center discontinued advisories, as the depression had become extratropical. It strengthened slightly to reach gale-force winds as an extratropical storm, and persisted until early on June 3.

Preparations and impact

In its first advisory on the depression, the National Hurricane Center emphasized the threat for heavy rainfall in Jamaica, Cuba, Haiti, south Florida, and the Bahamas. The agency also advised small craft in Cuba and the Cayman Islands to remain at port. The depression was the first tropical cyclone threat to south Florida since Hurricane Andrew nine months prior, although officials noted the depression's winds were no cause for concern.

In Victoria de Las Tunas, a rainfall total of  set the new record most rainfall in 24 hours. The rainfall caused flooding of rivers and lakes behind dams, and in some places, residents required rescue from the roofs of their houses. Officials forced the evacuation of 40,000 people in several provinces, and across the country, the storm destroyed 1,860 homes and damaged 16,500 more. The flooding blocked mountainous highways in Santiago de Cuba Province, and in Las Tunas Province railway lines were damaged. Widespread crop damage occurred just two months after the Storm of the Century left similar heavy damage. The flooding damaged 87 sugar production centers. The depression killed seven people in the country with another five missing, as reported by a newspaper on the day after the depression left the island. After the storm passed, the Cuban government activated the Civil Defense, while National Relief Services worked to rescue all people affected by the flooding. Elsewhere along its path, heavy rainfall was reported in Jamaica, Hispaniola, and southern Florida. In Haiti, the rainfall caused 13 deaths and left thousands of livestock killed.

See also

1993 Atlantic hurricane season
List of off-season Atlantic hurricanes

References

External links
National Hurricane Center
Monthly Weather Review for 1993

1993 Atlantic hurricane season
01 1993
01 1993
01 1993
01 1993
May 1993 events in North America
June 1993 events in North America